Serafim Moysidis (born 14 April 1990) is a Greek football player currently playing for AEEK SYN.KA.

Career
On 10 July 2019 it was confirmed, that Moysidis had joined AEEK SYN.KA.

References

External links
Guardian Football

1990 births
Living people
Vyzas F.C. players
Anagennisi Giannitsa F.C. players
Apollon Pontou FC players
Panegialios F.C. players
Niki Volos F.C. players
Edessaikos F.C. players
Association football central defenders
Footballers from Athens
Greek footballers